Cheick Kongo is a French mixed martial artist and former kickboxer who fights in the Heavyweight division of Bellator. A professional MMA competitor since 2001, he has also competed for the Ultimate Fighting Championship.

Early life
Born to a Burkinabé father and a Congolese mother, Kongo began training in martial arts when he was 5 years old, learning Kendo and Karate. As he grew older, he had already received black belt from both styles and began to expand his repertoire and trained in Boxing, Muay Thai, Savate, Wrestling and Shooto. at age of 19. At age 23, Silat, an Indonesian martial art, and was coached by Charles Joussot and Franck Ropers, men who brought Silat to France. He is also a cousin of rugby star Fulgence Ouedraogo, the French back-rower. Cheick is also a columnist for the French MMA magazine, Top Fight.

Mixed martial arts career
On June 10, 2001, Kongo began his professional career by knocking out Doog Ward. Kongo then followed up that win with a TKO over Dave van der Veen. He then lost his third professional MMA fight to Rodney Faverus by decision. He faced Gilbert Yvel on May 20, losing for the second time in his career when he tapped to strikes in the second round. He trained with Anderson Silva and Wanderlei Silva in the early days of Pride Fighting Championships.

Ultimate Fighting Championship
Kongo entered the UFC to fight Gilbert Aldana at UFC 61, whom he beat by TKO due to a doctor stoppage. Kongo followed up with a win over UFC newcomer Christian Wellisch by KO due to a knee strike, before losing to UFC newcomer Carmelo Marrero at UFC 64. Then, Kongo defeated Assuerio Silva by majority decision at UFC 70.  

At UFC 75 on September 8, 2007, he defeated Mirko Cro Cop by unanimous decision. Though there was controversy as Kongo kneed Cro Cop in the groin several times without having any points deducted, inspiring American MMA fans to give Kongo the nickname "Cup Cheick".

He fought against Heath Herring at UFC 82, losing by split decision. At UFC 87 he fought against UFC newcomer Dan "The Viking" Evensen, whom he defeated by first-round TKO.

Kongo fought at UFC 92 on December 27, 2008, where he beat former Cage Rage British Heavyweight champion Mustapha al-Turk by TKO. Kongo dropped Al Turk with two right hands. Then fired on a vicious ground and pound attack, Kongo pounced on al-Turk with elbows and punches, opening up a big cut above the eye. Referee Steve Mazzagatti stopped the fight after 4:37 of the first round. 

In his next fight he then defeated Antoni Hardonk at UFC 97 by second-round TKO.

Kongo replaced Heath Herring on three weeks notice at UFC 99 to face the up-and-coming Cain Velasquez in the co-main event. Kongo lost to Velasquez by unanimous decision in a one-sided affair. He did however, manage to drop Velasquez on two occasions with straight punches. It had been rumoured that if he was to defeat Velasquez, Kongo would earn a title shot against the winner of the UFC 100 Heavyweight Championship between Brock Lesnar and Frank Mir. Mir lost his bout against Lesnar and actually ended up fighting Kongo at UFC 107. During the pre-fight talk, Mir stated that Kongo had no ground game, so at the weigh ins Cheick Kongo turned his back to Mir, to be disrespectful. Mir won the fight by a submission. After connecting with a left overhand punch that dropped Kongo, Mir finished him with a guillotine choke, rendering Kongo unconscious just 72 seconds into the first round.

Kongo defeated Paul Buentello on March 21, 2010, at UFC Live: Vera vs. Jones by submission due to elbows.

Kongo was expected to face The Ultimate Fighter 10 winner Roy Nelson on July 3, 2010, at UFC 116 but a back injury to Kongo has caused the cancellation of the fight. Kongo would end up fighting Nelson almost 3 years later at UFC 159.

Kongo's next fight was against undefeated Travis Browne at UFC 120. They fought to a unanimous draw. Kongo repeatedly grabbed Browne's shorts and had 1 point deducted in the final round.

Kongo fought Pat Barry on June 26, 2011, at UFC on Versus 4. His fight against Barry became the main event since Nate Marquardt was not medically cleared for his welterweight debut against Rick Story. During the bout Kongo was dropped by a looping right hand. Visibly rocked, Kongo got back to his feet but was dropped again seconds later by another hard punch. Despite being dropped twice, Kongo was able to knock Barry out with a hard overhand right to the ear, followed by an uppercut to the chin to secure a win midway through the first round.

Kongo faced Matt Mitrione on October 29, 2011, at UFC 137. He won the fight via unanimous decision by utilizing his reach with his jab and securing multiple takedowns.

Kongo faced Mark Hunt on February 26, 2012, at UFC 144. He lost the fight via TKO in the first round.

Kongo was expected to face Antônio Rodrigo Nogueira on July 21, 2012, at UFC 149. However, Nogueira pulled out of the bout, citing that an arm injury sustained in his last bout against Frank Mir had not healed enough to resume the proper training and was replaced by Shawn Jordan. Kongo defeated Jordan via unanimous decision.

Kongo finally faced Roy Nelson on April 27, 2013, at UFC 159, a bout that was supposed to happen almost 3 years before at UFC 116. He lost the fight via knockout in the first round. After his loss to Nelson, Kongo's UFC contract expired and he was released from the UFC.

Before UFC 159 the UFC offered Kongo a four-fight deal, which he turned down. Kongo left the UFC with a 11-6-1 record.

On May 4, 2013 Kongo stated that he is on good terms with the UFC and was quoted saying: "Don't believe he said-she said stories. I have not been cut by the UFC. I am Cheick Kongo so I know best what's next for me. It doesn't mean that I am leaving the UFC, it doesn't mean that I am staying – it means this is my life." Kongo has stated that he is open to the possibility of resigning a contract with the UFC.

Bellator MMA
Shortly after it was announced that Cheick's teammate Rampage Jackson was going to Bellator, it was stated that Kongo will be following his teammate. Kongo's move to Bellator was official on August 28, 2013.

Kongo made his debut in the Season 9 Heavyweight tournament. He faced Mark Godbeer on October 4, 2013, at Bellator 102. Kongo won the fight via TKO in the second round.

He was then expected to face Vinicius Queiroz in the tournament finals, on November 2, 2013, at Bellator 106. However, due to a change in the line up, the bout was canceled.

Kongo vs. Queiroz was then expected to take place on November 8, 2013, at Bellator 107. However, Queiroz was later forced to withdraw from the bout due to a knee injury and was replaced by Peter Graham. Kongo won the fight via unanimous decision.

Kongo faced undefeated Bellator Heavyweight Champion Vitaly Minakov at Bellator 115 on April 4, 2014. He lost the back-and-forth fight via unanimous decision. Kongo faced Eric Smith at Bellator 120 on May 17, 2014. He won the fight via TKO by way of knees and punches at 4:35 of Round 2.

Kongo faced fellow striker Lavar Johnson at Bellator 123 on September 5, 2014. He won the fight via rear-naked choke submission in the first round. This marked his first submission win that was not caused by strikes since 2003.

Kongo faced King Mo Lawal at Bellator 134: The British Invasion on February 27, 2015. He lost the fight via split decision.

Kongo faced former Bellator Heavyweight Champion Alexander Volkov on June 26, 2015, at Bellator 139. He won the fight via unanimous decision.

Kongo faced Vinicius Queiroz at Bellator 150 on February 26, 2016. In the third round, Kongo was dropped by a right hand, however, he was able to recover and win a split decision.

Kongo faced Tony Johnson at Bellator 161 on September 16, 2016. He won the fight via majority decision.

Kongo faced former training partner Oli Thompson at Bellator 172 on February 18, 2017. He won the fight by unanimous decision.

Kongo faced Augusto Sakai at Bellator 179 on May 19, 2017. He won the fight via split decision.

Kongo faced Javy Ayala at Bellator 199 on May 12 in San Jose, CA. He won the fight via knockout in the first round.

Kongo faced Timothy Johnson on October 13, 2018, at Bellator 208. He won the fight by knockout in the first round.

Kongo faced Vitaly Minakov for a second time on February 16, 2019, at Bellator 216 He won the fight by unanimous decision.

On July 11, 2019, it was announced that Kongo will be facing Ryan Bader for the Bellator Heavyweight World Championship on September 7 at Bellator 226. The bout ended in a no contest at 3:52 of the first round after an accidental eye poke from Bader rendered Kongo unable to continue.

On May 4, 2020, it was revealed that Kongo had signed a multi-fight contract with Bellator.

On October 10, 2020, Kongo fought in a rematch Timothy Johnson at Bellator 248 in Paris, France. He lost via split decision.

Kongo faced Sergei Kharitonov on August 20, 2021 at Bellator 265. He won the fight via a rear-naked choke in round two.

Kongo faced Ryan Bader for the Bellator Heavyweight World Championship on May 6, 2022 at Bellator 280. He lost the bout via unanimous decision.

Championships and achievements

Kickboxing
 2005 World Champion Federation King of the Rings
 2005 King of Colosseum Tournament Champion
 2005 Rings World Champion
 2004 King of the Ring Super World Champion 
 2004 Muay Thai World Champion
 2003 Intercontinental Muay Thai Champion
 2002 RINGS European Champion
 2001 RINGS European Vice Champion
 European Savate Champion

Mixed martial arts
 Bellator MMA
 Bellator Season 9 Heavyweight Tournament Championship
 Most fights in Bellator Heavyweight division history (17)
 Most victories in Bellator Heavyweight division history (13)
 Ultimate Fighting Championship
 Knockout of the Night (One time) vs. Pat Barry 
 Knockout of the Year (2011) vs. Pat Barry 
 King of the Ring
 KOTR Super World Champion -103 kg
 World MMA Awards
 2011 Comeback of the Year  vs. Pat Barry at UFC Live: Kongo vs. Barry

Mixed martial arts record

|-
|Loss
|align=center|31–12–2 (1)
|Ryan Bader
|Decision (unanimous)
|Bellator 280
|
|align=center|5
|align=center|5:00
|Paris, France
|
|-
|Win
|align=center|31–11–2 (1)
| Sergei Kharitonov
| Submission (rear-naked choke)
| Bellator 265
| 
| align=center| 2
| align=center| 4:59
| Sioux Falls, South Dakota, United States
| 
|-
|Loss
|align=center|30–11–2 (1)
|Timothy Johnson
|Decision (split)
|Bellator 248
|
|align=center|3
|align=center|5:00
|Paris, France
|
|-
|NC
|align=center|30–10–2 (1)
|Ryan Bader
|NC (accidental eye poke)
|Bellator 226 
|
|align=center|1
|align=center|3:52
|San Jose, California, United States 
|
|-
|Win
|align=center|30–10–2
|Vitaly Minakov
|Decision (unanimous)
|Bellator 216
|
|align=center|3
|align=center|5:00
|Uncasville, Connecticut, United States
|
|-
|Win
|align=center|29–10–2
|Timothy Johnson
|KO (punches)
|Bellator 208
|
|align=center|1
|align=center|1:08
|Uniondale, New York, United States
|
|-
|Win
|align=center|28–10–2
|Javy Ayala
|KO (punches)
|Bellator 199
|
|align=center|1
|align=center|2:29
|San Jose, California, United States
|
|-
|Win
|align=center|27–10–2
|Augusto Sakai
|Decision (split)
|Bellator 179
|
|align=center|3
|align=center|5:00
|London, England
|
|-
|Win
|align=center|26–10–2
|Oli Thompson
|Decision (unanimous)
|Bellator 172
|
|align=center|3
|align=center|5:00
|San Jose, California, United States
|
|-
|Win
|align=center|25–10–2
|Tony Johnson
|Decision (majority)
|Bellator 161
|
|align=center|3
|align=center|5:00
|Cedar Park, Texas, United States
|
|-
|Win
|align=center|24–10–2
|Vinicius Queiroz
|Decision (split)
|Bellator 150
|
|align=center|3
|align=center|5:00
|Mulvane, Kansas, United States
|
|-
|Win
|align=center|23–10–2
|Alexander Volkov
|Decision (unanimous)
|Bellator 139
|
|align=center|3
|align=center|5:00
|Mulvane, Kansas, United States
|
|-
|Loss
|align=center|
|Muhammed Lawal
|Decision (split)
|Bellator 134
|
|align=center|3
|align=center|5:00
|Uncasville, Connecticut, United States
|
|-
| Win
| align=center| 22–9–2
| Lavar Johnson
| Submission (rear-naked choke)
| Bellator 123
| 
| align=center| 1
| align=center| 3:27
| Uncasville, Connecticut, United States
|
|-
| Win
| align=center| 21–9–2
| Eric Smith
| TKO (knees and punches)
| Bellator 120
| 
| align=center| 2
| align=center| 4:35
| Southaven, Mississippi, United States
|
|-
| Loss
| align=center| 20–9–2
| Vitaly Minakov
| Decision (unanimous)
| Bellator 115
| 
| align=center| 5
| align=center| 5:00
| Reno, Nevada, United States
| 
|-
| Win
| align= center| 20–8–2
| Peter Graham
| Decision (unanimous)
| Bellator 107
| 
| align=center| 3
| align=center| 5:00
| Thackerville, Oklahoma, United States
| 
|-
| Win
| align=center| 19–8–2
| Mark Godbeer
| TKO (knees and punches)
| Bellator 102
| 
| align=center| 2
| align=center| 2:04
| Visalia, California, United States
| 
|-
| Loss
| align=center| 18–8–2
| Roy Nelson
| KO (punches)
| UFC 159
| 
| align=center| 1
| align=center| 2:03
| Newark, New Jersey, United States
|
|-
| Win
| align=center| 18–7–2
| Shawn Jordan
| Decision (unanimous)
| UFC 149
| 
| align=center| 3
| align=center| 5:00
| Calgary, Alberta, Canada
|
|-
| Loss
| align=center| 17–7–2
| Mark Hunt
| TKO (punches)
| UFC 144
| 
| align=center| 1
| align=center| 2:11
| Saitama, Japan
|
|-
| Win
| align=center| 17–6–2
| Matt Mitrione
| Decision (unanimous)
| UFC 137
| 
| align=center| 3
| align=center| 5:00
| Las Vegas, Nevada, United States
|
|-
| Win
| align=center| 16–6–2
| Pat Barry
| KO (punch)
| UFC Live: Kongo vs. Barry
| 
| align=center| 1
| align=center| 2:39
| Pittsburgh, Pennsylvania, United States
| 
|-
| Draw
| align=center| 15–6–2
| Travis Browne
| Draw (unanimous)
| UFC 120
| 
| align=center| 3
| align=center| 5:00
| London, England
| 
|-
| Win
| align=center| 15–6–1
| Paul Buentello
| TKO (submission to elbows to the body)
| UFC Live: Vera vs. Jones
| 
| align=center| 3
| align=center| 1:16
| Broomfield, Colorado, United States
|
|-
| Loss
| align=center| 14–6–1
| Frank Mir
| Technical Submission (guillotine choke)
| UFC 107
| 
| align=center| 1
| align=center| 1:12
| Memphis, Tennessee, United States
|
|-
| Loss
| align=center| 14–5–1
| Cain Velasquez
| Decision (unanimous)
| UFC 99
| 
| align=center| 3
| align=center| 5:00
| Cologne, Germany
|
|-
| Win
| align=center| 14–4–1
| Antoni Hardonk
| TKO (punches)
| UFC 97
| 
| align=center| 2
| align=center| 2:29
| Montreal, Quebec, Canada
|
|-
| Win
| align=center| 13–4–1
| Mostapha al-Turk
| TKO (elbows and punches)
| UFC 92
| 
| align=center| 1
| align=center| 4:37
| Las Vegas, Nevada, United States
|
|-
| Win
| align=center| 12–4–1
| Dan Evensen
| TKO (punches)
| UFC 87
| 
| align=center| 1
| align=center| 4:55
| Minneapolis, Minnesota, United States
|
|-
| Loss
| align=center| 11–4–1
| Heath Herring
| Decision (split)
| UFC 82
| 
| align=center| 3
| align=center| 5:00
| Columbus, Ohio, United States
|
|-
| Win
| align=center| 11–3–1
| Mirko Cro Cop
| Decision (unanimous) 
| UFC 75
| 
| align=center| 3
| align=center| 5:00
| London, England
|
|-
| Win
| align=center| 10–3–1
| Assuerio Silva
| Decision (majority)
| UFC 70
| 
| align=center| 3
| align=center| 5:00
| Manchester, England
|
|-
| Loss
| align=center| 9–3–1
| Carmelo Marrero
| Decision (split)
| UFC 64
| 
| align=center| 3
| align=center| 5:00
| Las Vegas, Nevada, United States
|
|-
| Win
| align=center| 9–2–1
| Christian Wellisch
| KO (knee)
| UFC 62
| 
| align=center| 1
| align=center| 2:51
| Las Vegas, Nevada, United States
|
|-
| Win
| align=center| 8–2–1
| Gilbert Aldana
| TKO (doctor stoppage)
| UFC 61
| 
| align=center| 1
| align=center| 4:13
| Las Vegas, Nevada, United States
|
|-
| Win
| align=center| 7–2–1
| Dave Dalgliesh
| TKO (punches)
| Rings Holland: Men of Honor
| 
| align=center| 2
| align=center| N/A
| Utrecht City, Utrecht
|
|-
| Win
| align=center| 6–2–1
| Gabor Nemeth
| KO (punches)
| King of the Ring: Mission Impossible
| 
| align=center| 2
| align=center| N/A
| Zagreb, Croatia
| 
|-
| Loss
| align=center| 5–2–1
| Gilbert Yvel
| TKO (punches)
| It's Showtime 2004 Amsterdam
| 
| align=center| 2
| align=center| 4:40
| Amsterdam, Netherlands
|
|-
| Win
| align=center| 5–1–1
| Joop Kasteel
| KO (punch)
| RINGS Holland: World's Greatest
| 
| align=center| 1
| align=center| 4:31
| Utrecht City, Utrecht
|
|-
| Win
| align=center| 4–1–1
| Dave Vader
| Decision (unanimous)
| RINGS Holland: The Untouchables
| 
| align=center| 3
| align=center| 2:00
| Utrecht City, Utrecht
|
|-
| Win
| align=center| 3–1–1
| Hans Nijman
| Submission (armbar)
| It's Showtime 2003 Amsterdam
| 
| align=center| 2
| align=center| 0:59
| Amsterdam, Netherlands
|
|-
| Draw
| align=center| 2–1–1
| Michael Knaap
| Draw (unanimous)
| It's Showtime: As Usual / Battle Time
| 
| align=center| 2
| align=center| 5:00
| Haarlem, North Holland
|
|-
| Loss
| align=center| 2–1
| Rodney Faverus
| Decision (unanimous)
| Rings Holland: Saved by the Bell
| 
| align=center| 2
| align=center| 5:00
| Amsterdam, Netherlands
|
|-
| Win
| align=center| 2–0
| Dave van der Veen
| TKO (punches)
| Rings Holland: Some Like It Hard
| 
| align=center| 2
| align=center| 1:25
| Utrecht City, Utrecht
|
|-
| Win
| align=center| 1–0
| André Tete
| Submission (heel hook)
| Rings Holland: No Guts, No Glory
| 
| align=center| 1
| align=center| 3:20
| Amsterdam, Netherlands
|

Kickboxing record (Incomplete)

See also
 List of current Bellator fighters
 List of male mixed martial artists
 List of male kickboxers

References

External links
 
 
 

1975 births
Living people
French male kickboxers
Heavyweight kickboxers
French male mixed martial artists
French mixed martial artists of Black African descent
Heavyweight mixed martial artists
French male karateka
French kendoka
French practitioners of Brazilian jiu-jitsu
French Muay Thai practitioners
French savateurs
French sportspeople of Burkinabé descent
Sportspeople of Burkinabé descent
French sportspeople of Democratic Republic of the Congo descent
Sportspeople from Paris
Ultimate Fighting Championship male fighters
Bellator male fighters
Mixed martial artists utilizing Kyokushin kaikan
Mixed martial artists utilizing savate
Mixed martial artists utilizing silat
Mixed martial artists utilizing Muay Thai
Mixed martial artists utilizing Greco-Roman wrestling
Mixed martial artists utilizing Brazilian jiu-jitsu
Black French sportspeople